Whetstone Township is one of the sixteen townships of Crawford County, Ohio, United States. As of the 2010 census the population was 2,080, 1,936 of whom lived in the unincorporated portion of the township.

Geography
Located in the southern part of the county, it borders the following townships:
Liberty Township - north
Sandusky Township - northeast
Jefferson Township - east
Polk Township - southeast, north of Washington Township
Washington Township, Morrow County - southeast, south of Polk Township
Tully Township, Marion County - south
Scott Township, Marion County - southwest corner
Dallas Township - west, south of Bucyrus Township
Bucyrus Township - west, north of Dallas Township
Holmes Township - northwest corner

Two municipalities are located in Whetstone Township: part of the village of North Robinson in the northeast, and part of the city of Bucyrus, the county seat of Crawford County, in the northwest.  The unincorporated community of New Winchester is located in the township's south.

Name and history
Whetstone Township was formed in the 1820s. It was named from Whetstone Creek.

It is the only Whetstone Township statewide.

Government
The township is governed by a three-member board of trustees, who are elected in November of odd-numbered years to a four-year term beginning on the following January 1. Two are elected in the year after the presidential election and one is elected in the year before it. There is also an elected township fiscal officer, who serves a four-year term beginning on April 1 of the year after the election, which is held in November of the year before the presidential election. Vacancies in the fiscal officership or on the board of trustees are filled by the remaining trustees.

References

External links
County website

Townships in Crawford County, Ohio
Townships in Ohio